Glitter, Doom, Shards, Memory is the third string quartet by the Israeli-born composer Shulamit Ran.  The work was commissioned by the arts organization Music Accord for the Pacifica Quartet who first performed it on May 24, 2014 in Toronto.

Composition
Glitter, Shards, Doom, Memory pays tribute to the Jewish artist Felix Nussbaum and other victims of the Holocaust.  Ran wrote in the score program note, “As in several other works composed since 1969, this is my way of saying, ‘Do not forget,’  something that I believe can be done through music with special power and poignancy.”  The title of the piece comes from an art exhibit of works from the Weimar Republic titled Glitter and Doom, which was formerly shown at the Metropolitan Museum of Art.

Structure
The work is composed in four movements:
That which happened
Menace
If I perish – do not let my paintings die
Shards, Memory

Reception
Reviewing the United States premiere of Glitter, Doom, Shards, Memory, John Y. Lawrence of the Chicago Classical Review declared the piece "beautifully and thoughtfully crafted" and wrote:
Zachary Woolfe of The New York Times also lauded the work, writing, "Ms. Ran's craftsmanship is, as ever, expert."

Hannah Nepil of the Financial Times was more critical of the piece, however, remarking that it was "a little too clever, and too artfully fragmented for its own good."  He added:

References

Compositions by Shulamit Ran
2013 compositions
Compositions for string quartet
Commissioned music